The Mirchi Music Award for Song of The Year is given yearly by Radio Mirchi as a part of its annual Mirchi Music Awards for Hindi films, to recognise the best song of that year.

List of winners
 2009 "Jashn-E-Bahara" - Jodhaa Akbar
 "Behka" - Ghajini
 "Kabhi Kabhi Aditi" - Jaane Tu... Ya Jaane Na
 "Khuda Jaane" - Bachna Ae Haseeno
 "Khwaja Mere Khwaja" - Jodhaa Akbar
 2010 "Masakali" - Delhi-6
 "Dhan Te Nan" - Kaminey
 "Iktara" - Wake Up Sid
 "Jai Ho" - Slumdog Millionaire
 "Arziyan" - Delhi-6
 2011 "Munni Badnaam Hui" - Dabangg
 "Tere Naina" - My Name is Khan
 "Sajda" - My Name is Khan
 "Sheila Ki Jawani" -Tees Maar Khan
 "Tere Mast Mast Do Nain" - Dabangg
 2012 "Senorita" - Zindagi Na Milegi Dobara
 "Nadaan Parinde" - Rockstar
 "Sadda Haq" - Rockstar
 "Chammak Challo" - Ra.One
 "Ooh La La" - The Dirty Picture
 2013 "Abhi Mujh Mein Kahin" - Agneepath
 "Tum Hi Ho Bandhu" - Cocktail
 "Dagabaaz Re" - Dabangg 2
 "Radha" - Student of the Year
 "Pani Da Rang" - Vicky Donor
 2014 "Tum Hi Ho" - Aashiqui 2
 "Sunn Raha Hai" - Aashiqui 2
 "Badtameez Dil" - Yeh Jawaani Hai Deewani
 "Zinda" - Bhaag Milkha Bhaag
 "Bhaag Milkha Bhaag" - Bhaag Milkha Bhaag
 2015 "Zehnaseeb" - Hasee Toh Phasee
 "London Thumakda" - Queen
 "Manwa Laage" - Happy New Year
 "Galliyan" - Ek Villain
 "Muskurane" - CityLights
 2016 "Gerua" - Dilwale
 "Agar Tum Saath Ho" - Tamasha
 "Sooraj Dooba Hain" - Roy
 "Deewani Mastani" from Bajirao Mastani
 "Chunar" from ABCD 2
 2017 "Channa Mereya" - Ae Dil Hai Mushkil
 "Haanikaarak Bapu" - Dangal
 "Channa Mereya (Unplugged)" - Ae Dil Hai Mushkil
 "Bulleya" - Ae Dil Hai Mushkil
 "Jag Ghoomeya" - Sultan
 "Ae Dil Hai Mushkil" - Ae Dil Hai Mushkil
 2018 "Hawayein" - Jab Harry Met Sejal
 "Maana Ke Hum Yaar Nahin" - Meri Pyaari Bindu
 "Baarish" - Half Girlfriend
 "Roke Na Ruke Naina" - Badrinath Ki Dulhania
 "Aashiq Surrender Hua" - Badrinath Ki Dulhania
 2019 "Ghoomar" - Padmaavat
 "Tareefan" - Veere Di Wedding
 "Khalibali" - Padmaavat
 "Bom Diggy" - Sonu Ke Titu Ki Sweety
 "Ae Watan (Male)" - Raazi
 2020 "Kalank" - Kalank
 "Chashni" - Bharat
 "Apna Time Ayega" - Gully Boy
 "Tujhe Kitna Chahne Lage" - Kabir Singh
 "Challa" - Uri: The Surgical Strike
 "Ghungroo" - War
 2022 ""Raataan Lambiyan" – Shershaah
 "Aabaad Barbaad" – Ludo
 "Chaka Chak" – Atrangi Re
 "Mann Bharryaa 2.0" – Shershaah
 "Ranjha" – Shershaah
 2023
 "Kesariya" – Brahmāstra: Part One – Shiva
 "Dholida" – Gangubai Kathiawadi
 "Jab Saiyaan" – Gangubai Kathiawadi
 "Ghodey Pe Sawaar" – Qala
 "Shauq" – Qala

See also
 Mirchi Music Awards
 Bollywood
 Cinema of India

References

Mirchi Music Awards